Fujiwara no Akisuke (1090–1155) was a waka poet and nobleman active in the Heian period Japan. One of his poems is included in the Ogura Hyakunin Isshu. A member of the Fujiwara clan, he was also known as Sakyō no Daibu Akisuke. His father was Fujiwara no Akisue.

External links 
E-text of his poems in Japanese

1090 births
1155 deaths
Fujiwara clan
12th-century Japanese poets
People of Heian-period Japan
Hyakunin Isshu poets
Shikashū